SDYuShOR Desna is a Ukrainian sports school specialized in football with the Olympic Reserve status based in Chernihiv. The school serves as a youth academy of Desna Chernihiv.

Stadium and facilities
The team plays in the Olympic Sports Training Center of Chernihiv (formerly Stadion Yuri Gagarin). The stadion built in 1936 for 3,000 spectators in eastern portion of a city park built in 1804. During World War II, the stadium was heavily damaged, and in the 1950s, it was completely reconstructed, including two stands for 11,000 spectators. In 1961, it was named after the Russian Soviet cosmonaut Yuri Gagarin. FC Desna Chernihiv, the senior team, also plays at the stadium.

Notable players
Andriy Yarmolenko is one of the main players who graduated from the SDYuShOR Desna academy.

Managers
 2008: Mykhaylo Yarmoshenko
 2015: Artem Padun 
 2020: Volodymyr Matsuta
 2020-2021: Mykhaylo Yarmoshenko 
 2021-2022: Volodymyr Matsuta
 2022-: Andriy Polyanytsya

Honours
 Obolon Cup 
   Winners 2022

See also
 List of Chernihiv Sport Teams
 FC Desna Chernihiv
 FC Desna-2 Chernihiv
 FC Desna-3 Chernihiv
 FC Chernihiv

References

External links
 

Media
Facebook

Youth Academy
Football clubs in Chernihiv
Football clubs in Chernihiv Oblast
Football academies in Ukraine